Ivan Zdravkov (born 25 June 1991) is a Bulgarian football midfielder.
He is the son of the international Bulgarian goalkeeper Zdravko Zdravkov.

Career
Ivan Zdravkov started his youth career at Slavia Sofia. He made his debut for Slavia in a league match against Vihren Sandanski on 27 October 2008.

References

External links
 Profile at pfcslavia.com

1991 births
Living people
Bulgarian footballers
Association football midfielders
First Professional Football League (Bulgaria) players
PFC Slavia Sofia players
PFC Kaliakra Kavarna players
FC Pomorie players
Sportspeople from Pleven